Baisha is a town of Hepu County, Guangxi, China. , it has one residential community and 23 villages under its administration.

References

Towns of Guangxi
Hepu County